Visut Watanasin or วิสุทธิ์ วัฒนสิน (born 20 November 1964) is a former Thai sprinter who competed in the men's 100m competition at the 1992 Summer Olympics. He recorded a 10.72, not enough to qualify for the next round past the heats. His personal best is 10.53, set in 1987. In 1988, in the same discipline, he recorded a 10.88. In both Olympiads, he ran for the Thai 4 × 100 m relay team.

References

1964 births
Living people
Visut Watanasin
Athletes (track and field) at the 1988 Summer Olympics
Athletes (track and field) at the 1992 Summer Olympics
Visut Watanasin
Athletes (track and field) at the 1994 Asian Games
Visut Watanasin
Visut Watanasin
Visut Watanasin
Visut Watanasin